This is a list of Tamil language films produced in the Tamil cinema in India that are released/scheduled to be released in 2020.

Box office collection 
The highest-grossing Kollywood films released in 2020, by worldwide box office gross revenue, are as follows:

January – March

April – June

July–September

October–December

Footnotes

References

External links 

Tamil
2020
Tamil